The Presidential Inauguration Support Ribbon is the United States National Guard military decoration awarded to National Guardsmen who support U.S. Presidential Inaugurations and meet certain criteria. It was first awarded following the inauguration of President Joe Biden in 2021.

History
In response to the Capitol Hill riots on January 6, 2021, elements from the National Guard of all 53 states, territories, and the District of Columbia were mobilized to enhance security before, during, and after the 2021 Presidential Inauguration.

Criteria
The ribbon is presently authorized for any National Guard personnel from any state, territory or the District of Columbia who deployed to the area before, during, or after the 59th U.S. Presidential Inauguration on Title 32 orders. Future periods of inaugural support will also establish eligibility for wear of the ribbon. Civilians who render inaugural support are eligible for award of an equivalent certificate indicating their support, but not a military decoration.

Wear
The ribbon is authorized for wear by National Guard members not on U.S. Title 10 orders, after Active Duty U.S. military awards and after authorized foreign awards and awards from a Guardsman's home state, following U.S. Army Regulation 670-1.

Description and symbolism
 Service Ribbon
Developed by the D.C. National Guard and approved by the Army Institute of Heraldry in late 2020, the ribbon features red, white and blue vertical bands at each end and three red stars centered horizontally on a white background. The three stars represent the Flag of Washington, D.C. and the red, white and blue colors represent the U.S. flag.

See also
 Awards and decorations of the United States Armed Forces

References

External links

 Guard Members Who Deployed for the Inauguration Are Getting a Brand-New Award

Devices and accouterments of United States military awards
 
Armed Forces
United States military-related lists
Awards established in 2021